Mimotrechus is a genus of beetles in the family Carabidae, containing the following species:

 Mimotrechus australiensis (Sloane, 1923)
 Mimotrechus carteri (Sloane, 1920)
 Mimotrechus obscuroguttatus Moore, 1972
 Mimotrechus scitulus Moore, 1972

References

Trechinae